The 2012 Toyota/Save Mart 350 was a NASCAR Sprint Cup Series stock car race held on June 24, 2012, at Sonoma Raceway in Sonoma, California. Contested over 110 laps, it was the sixteenth race of the 2012 NASCAR Sprint Cup Series season and the first of two road course competitions on the schedule. Clint Bowyer of Michael Waltrip Racing took his first win of the season, while Tony Stewart finished second and Kurt Busch finished third.

Report

Background
Sonoma Raceway is one of two road courses to hold NASCAR races, the other being Watkins Glen International. The Chute was only used for NASCAR events such as this race, and was criticized by many drivers, who preferred the full layout.

Before the race, Matt Kenseth led the Drivers' Championship with 565 points, and Dale Earnhardt Jr. stood in second with 561. Greg Biffle was third in the Drivers' Championship with 548, sixteen points ahead of Jimmie Johnson and thirty-four ahead of Denny Hamlin in fourth and fifth. Kevin Harvick, with 504, was seven points ahead of Martin Truex Jr., as Tony Stewart with 491 points, was ten ahead of Clint Bowyer and thirty-three in front of Brad Keselowski. In the Manufacturers' Championship, Chevrolet was leading with 105 points, eighteen points ahead of Toyota. Ford, with 77 points, was twenty-eight points ahead of Dodge in the battle for third. Kurt Busch was the defending race winner.

Five teams chose to temporarily replace their regular drivers with road course ringers. One of which was Tommy Baldwin Racing, who replaced regular David Reutimann with Tomy Drissi, while another was FAS Lane Racing who chose Boris Said to replace regular drivers, Reed Sorenson and Ken Schrader. Humphrey Smith Racing also changed drivers, with Mike Bliss, racing at Road America in the Nationwide Series on the weekend, being replaced with Chris Cook, while Phil Parsons Racing replaced Michael McDowell with David Mayhew and Inception Motorsports co-owner David Stremme stepped aside in favor of Brian Simo. Robby Gordon also qualified for his first race since Auto Club Speedway.

Practice and qualifying

Three practice sessions were scheduled to be held before the Sunday race—one on June 22, 2012, and two on June 23, 2012. The first session lasted 90 minutes. The second session was 45 minutes, while the final session finished after 75 minutes.  Jeff Gordon was quickest with a time of 75.653 seconds in the first session, less than two-tenths of a second faster than Truex Jr. Bowyer was just off Truex Jr.'s pace, followed by Joey Logano, Kyle Busch, and Ryan Newman. Marcos Ambrose was seventh, still within a second of Gordon's time.

Forty-four cars were entered for qualifying, but only forty-three could qualify for the race because of NASCAR's qualifying procedure. Ambrose clinched the second pole position of his career, with a record setting time of 75.203 seconds. He was joined on the front row of the grid by Gordon. Johnson qualified third, Biffle took fourth, and Truex Jr. started fifth. Bowyer, Kyle Busch, Kurt Busch, Kenseth and Newman rounded out the top ten. The driver that failed to qualify for the race was Brian Simo. Following the qualifying session, Ambrose stated, "I beat myself up here in 2010.It was nothing to do with the car or the track. It was me. I know what not to do on the last restart." Afterward, third-placed Johnson commented, "It was on edge the whole lap. I don't want to drive 110 laps the way it drove today."

In the second practice session, Gordon remained quickest with a time of 75.961 seconds. Ambrose, with a time of 76.718, was second quickest, ahead of Allmendinger, Juan Pablo Montoya, and Keselowski. Kyle Busch, Johnson, Truex Jr., Bowyer, and McMurray completed the first ten positions. Gordon continued to be quickest through the third practice session with a time of 76.846, 0.885 slower than his fastest lap during the second session. Biffle was second quickest in the session, while Montoya was scored third. Johnson followed in the fourth position ahead of Allmendinger, Hamlin and Edwards. Truex Jr., Kahne and Kyle Busch rounded out the first ten positions in eighth, ninth and tenth, respectively.

Race
The race, the fifteenth in the season, began at 3:21 p.m. EDT and was televised live in the United States on TNT. Track minister Tim Boeve began pre-race ceremonies, by giving the invocation. Next, University of California Straw Hat Band performed the national anthem, while Tony LaRussa and Toby Appleton, a Toyota Military Hero, gave the command for drivers to start their engines. During the pace laps, David Gilliland had to start last on the grid after missing the mandatory drivers meeting. After leading 13 laps, Gordon would reach the 23,000 career laps led mark, the most of any current Sprint Cup Series driver .

Results

Qualifying

Notes
 — David Gilliland started last on the grid because of missing the mandatory drivers meeting.
 — Stephen Leicht also had to start in the rear of the grid after his team changed engines.

Race results

Standings after the race

Drivers' Championship standings

Manufacturers' Championship standings

Note: Only the top five positions are included for the driver standings.

References

NASCAR races at Sonoma Raceway
Toyota Save Mart 350
Toyota Save Mart 350
Toyota Save Mart 350